Kenny Macintyre is a Scottish sports broadcaster who works for BBC Scotland.

Macintyre provides match reports for Sportsound on BBC Radio Scotland and occasionally hosts the programme. He is married to former BBC Scotland colleague and Reporting Scotland presenter Abeer Macintyre.

Kenny's brother is Mull Historical Society's Colin MacIntyre and his late father, also called Kenny, was acclaimed BBC Scotland Political Correspondent prior to his death. His grandfather was poet Angus Macintyre.

References

Living people
Year of birth missing (living people)
British sports broadcasters
People from the Isle of Mull
Place of birth missing (living people)